Feiler is a surname. Notable people with the surname include:

 Bruce Feiler (born 1964), American author
 Dror Feiler (born 1951), Israeli-born Swedish musician
 Gunilla Sköld-Feiler (born 1953), Swedish artist
 Hertha Feiler (1916–1970), Austrian actress
 Jo Feiler (born 1951), American artist
 Manfred Feiler (1925–2020), German artist
 Matt Feiler (born 1992), American football player
 Paul Feiler (1918–2013), German-born British artist
 Uwe Feiler (born 1965), German politician

See also
 Feiler Faster Thesis

Occupational surnames
German-language surnames